Creature(s) of the night may refer to:

Creatures of the Night, a 1982 album by the rock band Kiss
"Creatures of the Night" (Kiss song), a 1982 song from that album
"Creatures of the Night" (Hardwell and Austin Mahone song), 2017
"Touch-a, Touch-a, Touch-a Touch Me", a song from The Rocky Horror Picture Show (alternate name, derived from the refrain)
 "No Tears (For The Creatures of The Night)", a 1978 song from Tuxedomoon
Creatures of the Night (film), a 1934 Italian drama film
Creatures of the Night (book), by Sal Piro, on the subject of The Rocky Horror Picture Show
Creatures of the Night (comics), by Neil Gaiman and Michael Zulli
Any nocturnal animal
Creature of the Night (novel), a 2005 fantasy novel by Kate Thompson
Vampire, mythological creatures who subsist by feeding on the blood of the living
Night owl (person), a person who tends to stay up very late into the night
(I'll Never Be) Maria Magdalena, a 1985 song by West German singer Sandra Cretu (by a prominent attribution from the refrain)
"Creatures of the Night" (CSI: NY episode), a 2004 television program